The 2014 IRB Nations Cup was the ninth edition of the international rugby union tournament, a competition created by the International Rugby Board. For the eighth time in a row, it was held in Bucharest, Romania. All of the fixtures were played at the 5,000 capacity Stadionul Naţional de Rugby, the home stadium for the hosts .

The Emerging Ireland team won the title for the first time and Robin Copeland was named as the player of the tournament.

Standings

Fixtures

Matchday 1

Matchday 2

Matchday 3

Top scorers

Top points scorers

Top try scorers

See also
 2014 IRB Pacific Nations Cup
 2014 IRB Tbilisi Cup

References

External links

2014
2014 rugby union tournaments for national teams
International rugby union competitions hosted by Romania
2013–14 in Romanian rugby union
2013–14 in Irish rugby union
2014 in Russian rugby union
rugby union
Sport in Bucharest